POAH is an acronym for preoptic anterior hypothalamus, the part of the brain that senses core body temperature and regulates it to about 36.8 °C (98.6 °F).

References
 -- Method for Heating the Preoptic Anterior Hypothalamus

External links

The Hypothalamus and Pituitary at endotexts.org

See also
 Hypothalamus
 Preoptic area
 Thermoregulation

Hypothalamus